Mickey Elick (born March 17, 1974) is a Canadian former professional ice hockey defenceman, most recently for EC Dornbirn in the Austrian National League.

Playing career
Born in Calgary, Alberta, Elick was drafted 192nd overall by the New York Rangers in the 1992 NHL Entry Draft and spent four years at the University of Wisconsin before turning pro in 1996 with the ECHL's Charlotte Checkers.  After playing for the Canadian National Team in 1997, Elick spent the 1998–99 season in the American Hockey League with the Saint John Flames and in the International Hockey League with the Grand Rapids Griffins.

In 1999, Elick moved to Europe and joined the Krefeld Pinguine of the Deutsche Eishockey Liga in Germany.  He went on to play four more seasons in the DEL, playing for Düsseldorfer EG, the Augsburger Panther and the Kölner Haie.  In 2004, Elick moved to Austria to play for EHC Black Wings Linz in the EBHL.  In 2005, Elick signed for EC VSV.

After five seasons with Villacher, Elick signed with EC Dornbirn for the 2010-11 season, in the lower Austrian National League on August 12, 2010.

Career statistics

Regular season and playoffs

International

Awards and honours

References

External links

1974 births
Augsburger Panther players
Binghamton Rangers players
Canadian ice hockey defencemen
Charlotte Checkers (1993–2010) players
Düsseldorfer EG players
EHC Black Wings Linz players
EV Landshut players
Grand Rapids Griffins players
Kölner Haie players
Krefeld Pinguine players
Living people
New York Rangers draft picks
Ice hockey people from Calgary
Saint John Flames players
EC VSV players
Wisconsin Badgers men's ice hockey players
Canadian expatriate ice hockey players in Austria
Canadian expatriate ice hockey players in Germany